Kot Ismail is a small village, situated in the area of Chiniot District, Punjab, Pakistan.

References

Villages in Chiniot District